Pierre Everaert (21 December 1933 – 26 May 1989) was a French professional racing cyclist between the years 1955 and 1966. He rode in eight editions of the Tour de France, with a highest general classification of 32nd and a best stage finish of second, both in the 1960 edition.

References

External links
 

1933 births
1989 deaths
French male cyclists
Sportspeople from Nord (French department)
Cyclists from Hauts-de-France
20th-century French people